Berković is a Serbo-Croatian surname. It is attested since the Late Middle Ages. It may refer to:

Carlo Berković (born 1994), Croatian football goalkeeper
Haris Berković, Serbian singer, Grand Production
Josip Berković (1885–1968), Mayor of Split 1928–29
Zvonimir Berković (1928–2009), Croatian film director

See also
Berkovići, village in Bosnia and Herzegovina
Berkovich, surname
Berkovics, Hungarian surname
Perković

References

Croatian surnames
Serbian surnames